The Coconut War was a brief clash between Papua New Guinean soldiers and rebels in Espiritu Santo shortly before and after the independence of the Republic of Vanuatu was declared on 30 July 1980.

Background 

Prior to Vanuatu's independence, the islands were known as the New Hebrides. The New Hebrides were governed by a condominium of France and the United Kingdom. In 1980, France and the United Kingdom agreed that Vanuatu would be granted independence on 30 July 1980.

Beginning in June 1980, Jimmy Stevens, head of the Nagriamel movement, led an uprising against the colonial officials and the plans for independence. The uprising lasted about 12 weeks. The rebels blockaded Santo-Pekoa International Airport, destroyed two bridges, and declared the independence of Espiritu Santo island as the "State of Vemerana". Stevens was supported by French-speaking landowners and by the Phoenix Foundation, an American business foundation that supported the establishment of a libertarian tax haven in the New Hebrides.

Confrontation 

On 8 June 1980, the New Hebrides government asked Britain and France to send troops to put down a rebellion on the island of Espiritu Santo. France and Britain sent troops but the French refused to allow them to take any effective action against the rebels. As independence day neared, the Prime Minister-elect, Walter Lini, asked Papua New Guinea if it would send troops to intervene. As Papua New Guinean soldiers began arriving in Espiritu Santo, the foreign press began referring to the ongoing events as the "Coconut War".

However, the "war" was brief and unconventional. The residents of Espiritu Santo generally welcomed the Papua New Guineans as fellow Melanesians. Stevens's followers were armed with only bows and arrows, rocks, and slings. There were few casualties, and the war came to a sudden end: when a vehicle carrying Stevens's son burst through a Papua New Guinean roadblock in late August 1980, the soldiers opened fire on the vehicle, killing Stevens's son. On 28 August Jimmy Stevens surrendered, stating that he had never intended that anyone be harmed.

At Stevens's trial, the support of the Phoenix Foundation to the Nagriamel movement was revealed. It was also revealed that the French government had secretly supported Stevens in his efforts. Stevens was sentenced to 14 years' imprisonment; he remained in prison until 1991.

Notes

References
Richard Shears (1980). The Coconut War: The Crisis on Espiritu Santo (Cassel: North Ryde, NSW )
Andrew Stewart (2001). Of Cargoes, Colonies and Kings: Diplomatic and Administrative Service from Africa to the Pacific (I. B. Tauris: London ) pp. 214–224
"A Memory of the Coconut War: Rebel  Leader Jimmy Stevens Freed", The Economist, 31 August 1991

Contemporary newspaper reports
"New Hebrides Calling for Help to Put Down Rebellion", The New York Times, 31 May 1980, p. 11
"Separatists Threaten Hebrides Unity", The New York Times, 8 June 1980, p. E2
"New Hebrides Asks for Aid in Revolt; Plea Might Go to U.N.", The New York Times, 8 June 1980, p. 12
"Unrest Spreads in New Hebrides", The New York Times, 11 June 1980, p. A8
"British Answering New Hebrides Call; Company of Marines Being Sent 'to Provide Stability'", The New York Times, 12 June 1980, p. A5
"British-French Control Ends in New Hebrides, Now Named Vanuatu", The New York Times, 30 July 1980, p. 11
"Rebels Blow Up 2 Bridges on Island of Espiritu Santo", The New York Times, 4 August 1980, p. A5
"40 Are Seized on Espiritu Santu in a Drive Against Secessionists", The New York Times, 4 August 1980, p. B8
"55 French Are Evacuated From Espiritu Santo Island", The New York Times, 18 August 1980, p. A5
"Leader of Espiritu Santo Rebels Says That He'll Surrender Today", The New York Times, 29 August 1980, p. 3
"Troops Reportedly Crush Rebellion on Espiritu Santo",  The New York Times, 1 September 1980, p. A5

External links
Vanuatu: History: Independence, Vanuatu Tourism Office, 2009
Franky Stevens's interview about Vanuatu independence history

1980 in Oceania
1980 in Papua New Guinea
1980 in Vanuatu
History of Vanuatu
Conflicts in 1980
France–Vanuatu relations
France–Papua New Guinea relations
France–Solomon Islands relations
Papua New Guinea–Vanuatu relations
Solomon Islands–Vanuatu relations
Wars involving the states and peoples of Oceania
Wars involving Papua New Guinea
Wars involving Vanuatu
Rebellions in Oceania
New Hebrides
Libertarianism in Oceania
Controversies within libertarianism
Wars involving the Solomon Islands